Coronation chicken or Poulet Reine Elizabeth is a chicken meat dish made from an Indian inspired creamy curry sauce. It can be eaten as a salad or used to fill sandwiches.

Composition 

Normally bright yellow, coronation chicken is usually flavoured with curry powder or paste, although more sophisticated versions of the recipe are made using fresh herbs and spices and additional ingredients such as flaked almonds, raisins, and crème fraîche. The original dish calls for dried apricot and not raisins, and uses curry powder instead of Indian curry paste made from scratch, as fresh Indian curry spices were almost unobtainable in post-war Britain.

History 
Constance Spry, an English food writer and flower arranger, and Rosemary Hume, a chef, both principals of the Cordon Bleu Cookery School in London, are credited with the invention of coronation chicken. Preparing the food for the banquet of the coronation of Queen Elizabeth II in 1953, Spry proposed the recipe of cold chicken, curry cream sauce and dressing that would later become known as coronation chicken.

Coronation chicken may have been inspired by jubilee chicken, a dish prepared for the silver jubilee of George V in 1935, which mixed chicken with mayonnaise and curry. Additionally, for the Queen's Golden Jubilee in 2002, another celebratory dish was devised, also called Jubilee chicken.

See also
 Platinum Pudding
 Chicken salad
 List of chicken dishes

References

External links 

 Recipe for the original Coronation Chicken by Andrea Soranidis (Author and Food Blogger)
 Blog post on the origins and whether it has links to the Coronation Sussex breed of chicken
 Prize-winning recipe from Telegraph's 2002 contest
 History of Coronation Chicken by James McIntosh (Food Writer)

British cuisine
British sandwiches
British chicken dishes
Coronation of Elizabeth II
Indian cuisine in the United Kingdom
Curry dishes
British salads